ruwido austria gmbh is an Austrian technology company based in Neumarkt am Wallersee near Salzburg. The company has full production, design, hardware and software development under one roof.  

Having been founded in 1969, the company gained considerable and irreplaceable expertise in the market of infrared technology. ruwido is built on almost 50 years of experience in consumer electronics. 25 percent of ruwido’s employees are dedicated to research and development, which enables the company to excel in new interaction techniques, user experience and usability concepts.

Technology and innovations 
The company is specialized in innovative design, enhanced technology and scientific research to enable intuitive navigation and user experience excellence. Being highly concerned about the environment, ruwido created a new product architecture called “better world architecture”, which stands for products with no silicone, no printing, no lacquering, plastics made of organic materials and a tremendous reduction of components, resulting in a carbon footprint two thirds smaller than it was before. yet still keeping the brilliant look & feel of a premium remote.

Sustainability 
Sustainable development is integrated into all our business processes and strategic planning of the company. For the last decade ruwido has worked on 100% renewable energy and has done everything to minimize the CO2 emissions and carbon footprint, especially during manufacturing operations.

Ferdinand Maier, ceo & owner, says: “Keeping remote controls production in austria is the best key to maintain the high quality and sustainability standards. With design, development and manufacturing from the bare granules to the finally packed product under one roof, we can always guarantee that the remote controls are made using 100% renewable energy, under excellent working conditions and with highest quality and social standards.”

External links 
 Official website

References 

Electronics companies established in 1969
Austrian companies established in 1969
Electronics companies of Austria
Economy of Salzburg (state)